Siege of Acre may refer to:

Siege of Acre (1104), following the First Crusade
Siege of Acre (1189–1191), during the Third Crusade
Siege of Acre (1263), Baibars laid siege to the Crusader city, but abandoned it to attack Nazareth.
Siege of Acre (1291), the fall of the final Crusader city in the Levant
Siege of Acre (1799), during the French Revolutionary Wars
Siege of Acre (1821), part of Ottoman power struggles
Siege of Acre (1832), by Ibrahim Pasha of Egypt

See also
 Battle of Acre (disambiguation)